Branch is an unincorporated community located in the Town of Manitowoc Rapids, in Manitowoc County, Wisconsin, United States. Branch is located on U.S. Route 10, east of Whitelaw.

Branch was named for the nearby Branch River, which flows into the Manitowoc River.

References

Unincorporated communities in Manitowoc County, Wisconsin
Unincorporated communities in Wisconsin